Madatharuvi is a 1967 Indian Malayalam-language film, directed and produced by P. A. Thomas. The film stars Sukumari, Adoor Bhasi, Thikkurissy Sukumaran Nair and Musthafa. The film had musical score by B. A. Chidambaranath.

Cast

Sukumari
Adoor Bhasi
Thikkurissy Sukumaran Nair
Musthafa
Muthukulam Raghavan Pillai
O. Ramdas
T. R. Omana
Varghese Vadakara
Zero Babu
Nandakumar
Baby Kanakasree
Baby Santha
C. I. Paul
C. M. Abraham
Changanacherry Mani
Chidambaranth
Eepan
K. P. Ummer
Kalavathi Saraswathi
Kamaladevi
Kathirpur
Khadeeja
Kollam Mani
Krishnan
M. G. Menon
Master Shaji
Master Dinesh
Master Joji
P. A. Krishnan
Paravoor Bharathan
Punaloor Alex
Raghava Menon
S. N. Puram
Santo Krishnan
K. V. Shanthi
Stunt Bhaskaran
Suresh Babu
Ushakumari
Varma
Venkidesan
Wahab Kashmiri

Soundtrack
The music was composed by B. A. Chidambaranath and the lyrics were written by P. Bhaskaran.

References

External links
 

1967 films
1960s Malayalam-language films
Films directed by P. A. Thomas